Muhammad Nazmi Bin Nasaruddin is a Malaysian professional football referee FIFA since 2016.

Career

Nazmi has refereed in the Premier League and Super League since 2011, being promoted to the FIFA international referee list in 2016. He officiated numerous matches in the AFC Champions League and the AFC Cup, as a fourth official.

In February 2017, he officiated an 2017 AFC Cup match, the group stage tie between Yadanarbon F.C. and Home United FC.

References 

1990 births
Living people
Malaysian football referees
Malaysian people of Malay descent
Sportspeople from Penang